Gavin Ortlund is a writer, a Christian theologian, a pastor at First Baptist Church of Ojai, California and a Christian apologist. Gavin Ortlund has a PhD from Fuller Theological Seminary, he is the author of seven different books and multiple academic articles. Gavin Ortlund runs a YouTube channel "Truth Unites", which is focused on the Christian life, apologetics and theology.

Education 
Gavin Ortlund has a PhD from Fuller Theological Seminary, an MDiv from Covenant Theological Seminary and a BA in religion and philosophy from the University of Georgia.

Career 
Gavin Ortlund has written multiple books, including Theological Retrieval for Evangelicals: Why We Need Our Past to Have a Future and Finding the Right Hills to Die on: The Case for Theological Triage.  Ortlund has debated Trent Horn (a member of Catholic Answers) on the issue of purgatory and on the issue of Baptismal regeneration. He has criticized John MacArthur and others for "prioritizing worship over loving your neighbor, obedience to government and maintaining a good witness", emphasizing the command to obey authorities.

In his "Why God Makes Sense in a World That Doesn't" Gavin Ortlund argues for theism, making a case for the existence of God. Ortlund has written a commentary on the work of Anselm. He has written on Christian unity, criticizing sectarianism as well as doctrinal indifference. Ortlund has opposed those who call for "an end to the Reformation". 

Gavin Ortlund has defended the doctrine of divine simplicity and the Thomistic view of the beatific vision.

Gavin Ortlund has defended the view that Noah's flood was a regional event and not a global event.

Personal life 
Gavin Ortlund is the grandson of Ray and Anne Ortlund and the son of Raymond C. Ortlund Jr. His brothers include Eric Ortlund, a professor at Oak Hill College in London, and Dane Ortlund, author of the popular Christian book Gentle and Lowly. Gavin Ortlund is married and has 5 children.

References 

American evangelicals
American male non-fiction writers
American YouTubers
Christian apologists
Year of birth missing (living people)
Living people
University of Georgia alumni
Covenant Theological Seminary alumni
Fuller Theological Seminary alumni